John Durham may refer to:
John Durham (born 1950), American federal prosecutor
John Durham (Medal of Honor) (1843–1918), American Civil War soldier and Medal of Honor recipient
John Durham (MP) (died 1420), for Middlesex (UK Parliament constituency)
John S. Durham (ambassador) (1861–1919), American diplomat

See also